FC Elektron Ivano-Frankivsk was a football team based in Ivano-Frankivsk, Ukrainian SSR.

History
The club was founded sometime before 1972.

Honors
Ukrainian Cup for collective teams of physical culture
 Holders: (1): 1976
 Finalists (1): 1977

Ivano-Frankivsk Oblast football championship
 Winners (6): 1972, 1973, 1974, 1976,1977, 1985
 Runners-up (2): 1979, 1984

Ivano-Frankivsk Oblast Cup
 Holders (5): 1973, 1974, 1976, 1977, 1983

Coaches
 1969–1972 Myroslav Dumanskyi
 1976–1985 Roman Mazur

References

Football clubs in Ivano-Frankivsk
Defunct football clubs in Ukraine
Defunct football clubs in the Soviet Union
Association football clubs established in the 1970s
Association football clubs disestablished in the 1980s
1970s establishments in Ukraine
1980s disestablishments in Ukraine